Giuseppe Serpotta (1653–1719) was a Sicilian sculptor, the brother of the famous stucco sculptor Giacomo Serpotta (1652–1732). He died in Palermo.

References

1653 births
1719 deaths
17th-century Italian sculptors
Italian male sculptors
18th-century Italian sculptors
18th-century Italian male artists